This is a list of digital library projects.

See also
 Bibliographic database
 List of academic databases and search engines
 List of online databases
 List of online encyclopedias
 List of open-access journals
 List of search engines

References

Digital library projects
Digital library projects
Digital library projects
Digital library projects